Gun Fight, known as  in Japan and Europe, is a 1975 multidirectional shooter arcade game designed by Tomohiro Nishikado, and released by Taito in Japan and Europe and by Midway in North America. Based around two Old West cowboys armed with revolvers and squaring off in a duel, it was the first video game to depict human-to-human combat. The Midway version was also the first video game to use a microprocessor. The game's concept was adapted from Sega's 1969 arcade electro-mechanical game Gun Fight.

The game was a global commercial success. In Japan, Western Gun was among the top ten highest-grossing arcade video games of 1976. In the United States, Gun Fight sold 8,600 arcade cabinets and was the third highest-grossing arcade game of 1975, second highest-grossing arcade game of 1976 and fifth highest arcade game of 1977.

It was ported to the Bally Astrocade video game console as a built-in game in 1977 and later the Atari 8-bit family. It is the first ever violent video game that depicts violence like realistic death.

Gameplay
Western Gun is a single-screen shooter where two players compete in an Old West gun fight. It was the first video game to depict human-to-human combat. When shot, the characters in fall to the ground and the words "GOT ME!" appear above the body. The game has two joysticks per player: an eight-way joystick for moving the computerized cowboy and the other for changing the shooting direction. Unlike later dual stick games, Western Gun has the movement joystick on the right.

Obstacles between the characters block shots, such as a cactus, and (in later levels) stagecoaches. The guns have limited ammunition, with each player given six bullets. A round ends if both players run out of ammo. Gunshots can ricochet off the top and bottom edges of the playfield, allowing for indirect hits.

Taito's original Western Gun allows the two players to move around anywhere on the screen. Midway's version, Gun Fight, restricts each player to their respective portions of the screen and also increased the size of the characters.

Development
Both Western Gun and Gun Fight have artwork of Wild West cowboys on the cabinet, with matching in-game graphics featuring cacti, rocks, and human characters (and a covered wagon in Gun Fight). These cartoon-like humans were in contrast to earlier games which used miniature shapes to represent abstract blocks or spaceships.

The original game, Western Gun, was created by Tomohiro Nishikado for Taito. The game's concept was adapted from a Sega arcade electro-mechanical game, also called Gun Fight, which was released in 1969. In that game, two players control cowboy figurines on opposing sides of a playfield full of obstacles, with each player attempting to shoot the opponent's cowboy. The cowboy figurines were adapted into character sprites, with both players able to maneuver across a landscape while shooting each other. It was the second game by Nishikado to use human character sprites, after a 1974 sports video game he designed for Taito, Basketball, which was released as TV Basketball by Midway in North America.

Taito licensed Western Gun to Midway for release in North America, one of the first such licenses, after the 1974 scrolling racing game Speed Race, also designed by Nishikado, and the 1974 sports game Basketball. The title Western Gun, while making perfect sense for Japanese audiences in that it conveyed the setting and theme as simply as possible, sounded odd to American audiences, so it was renamed Gun Fight for its American localization.

Taito's version was based on discrete logic. When Dave Nutting adapted the game for Midway, he decided to base it on the Intel 8080, which made Gun Fight the first video game to use a microprocessor. Nutting's company Dave Nutting Associates had already used microprocessor technology in prototypes of arcade pinball machines, and the first arcade pinball machine to include a microprocessor, The Spirit of '76 by Mirco Games, used this technology under license.

Midway's version, which had a black-and-white raster monitor with a transparent yellow screen overlay, used bitmapped framebuffer technology to display the game text and graphics, including its animated human-like characters. To make the animation fast and smooth, the game included a special barrel shifter circuit built from multiple discrete chips. The microprocessor used this to shift each pattern of picture bits, byte-by-byte, to the proper horizontal bit offset, reading back each shifted byte and then writing it into the framebuffer. The 8080, like other microprocessors of its era, had shift instructions that could only shift by a single bit position. With the shifter circuit, the microprocessor could quickly shift a picture byte by several bit positions, giving it more time for other work. A similar shifter circuit was used in later Midway and Taito games whose hardware was based on Gun Fight, such as Sea Wolf and Space Invaders. (In some later Space Invaders derivatives, such as Taito's Space Invaders Part II of 1979, this circuit is a Fujitsu MB14241, a single-chip implementation of the barrel shifter.)

Midway's version increased the size of the character sprites, while at the same time restricting each character's movement to their respective portions of the screen. Nishikado believed that his original version was more fun than Midway's version, but he was impressed with the Midway machine's improved graphics and smoother animation. This led him to design microprocessors into his subsequent games, including the 1978 shoot 'em up Space Invaders.

Reception
In Japan, Western Gun was among the top ten highest-grossing arcade video games of 1976.

In the United States, following its November 1975 release there, Gun Fight sold 500 arcade cabinets by the end of 1975, making it one of the top ten best-selling arcade games of 1975. It eventually went on to sell 8,600 arcade cabinets in the United States.

In March 1976, the first annual RePlay arcade chart listed Gun Fight as the third highest-grossing arcade game of the previous year in the United States, below the Kee game Tank I & II and Taito/Midway game Wheels I & II. In October 1976, RePlay listed Gun Fight as the second highest-grossing arcade game of 1976 in the United States, below Midway's Sea Wolf. In November 1977, the first annual Play Meter arcade chart listed Gun Fight as the fifth highest-grossing arcade video game of 1977. Play Meter later listed it among the top 30 highest-grossing arcade games of 1978.

In 2021, The Guardian listed it as the eleventh greatest video game of the 1970s.

Ports
In 1978, the game was introduced to the home market with a port to the Bally Astrocade, which included a color version of the game within the system's ROM.

In 1983, Epyx released Gun Fight and another Midway game, Sea Wolf II, for the Atari 8-bit family as an Arcade Classics compilation.

Legacy
The game was included in GameSpy's "Hall of Fame" in 2002. They stated that "Gun Fight was the first game to feature two humanized characters attempting to outfight each other, which would become one of the most common themes in games for the next 25-plus years"; that it was one of the first Japanese video games imported to North America; and that Midway's version "was the first microprocessor-based arcade game."

Atari, Inc. released a similar arcade game in 1976 titled Outlaw which was ported to the Atari VCS.

In 1982, the clone Gunfight was released for the Atari 8-bit family by Hofacker / Elcomp Publishing.  The Duel for the Commodore 64 is a clone released in 1985.

Taito used a control scheme similar to Western Gun for the run and gun video game Front Line (1982). In 1995, GamesMaster host Dominik Diamond called Sega's arcade game Virtual On: Cyber Troopers "a futuristic version of the old Gun Fight game."

See also
Boot Hill (1977)
Sheriff (1979)

Notes

References

External links

Arcade-History.com Gun Fight page

1975 video games
Arcade video games
Atari 8-bit family games
Bally Astrocade games
Midway video games
Multidirectional shooters
Pack-in video games
Taito arcade games
Video games developed in Japan
Video games developed in the United States
Western (genre) video games